Mario Noce (born 20 October 1999) is an Italian professional footballer who plays as defender for  club Legnago.

Club career

Early career 
At the age of four he joined the children's team Polispostiva Catania 1980. Later he joined San Pio, where he played for three years. In 2010, he joined the youth sector of Catania.

Chieri 
On 1 August 2017 he was loaned to Chieti.

Gozzano 
In winter 2018 he was loaned to Gozzano. He helped the team to win group A of the 2017–18 Serie D. He made 2 appearances.

Catania 
He made his debut in the first team on 5 August 2018, in the second round of the Coppa Italia against Foggia in the away match.  They won 1–3.

Cesena 
Shortly after his professional debut he returned to play in Serie D for Cesena. He made his debut with Cesena on 14 October 2018, in the 2–0 victory against Virtus Francavilla. On 28 October 2018 he scored his first goal for the team in a 0–2 away victory against Jesina. At the end of the championship they won group F of the 2018–19 Serie D. He made 31 appearances and one goal for Cesena.

Return to Catania 
In 2019 he signed a two-year professional contract for Catania. Despite this, he only managed to make 3 appearances with 0 goals in the 2019–20 season. His return to Catania began on 22 October 2019 in the 4–2 defeat against Avellino.

In the 2020–21 season he made 6 appearances and 0 goals, before moving to Potenza.

Potenza 
On 1 February 2021 he was loaned to Potenza. He made in that season only four appearances.

Ancona-Matelica
On 31 August 2021 he signed with Ancona-Matelica.

Legnago
On 24 August 2022, Noce moved to Legnago in Serie D.

Style of play 
He is a very fast right back.

Personal life 
Noce was born in Catania on 20 October 1999.

His father died on 3 April 2019 at the age of 54 due to a traffic collision with his Vespa.

Honours 
Gozzano

Serie D: 2017–18

Cesena

Serie D: 2018–19

External links

References 

1999 births
Living people
Footballers from Catania
Italian footballers
Footballers from Sicily
Association football defenders
Serie C players
Serie D players
Catania S.S.D. players
S.S. Chieti Calcio players
A.C. Gozzano players
Potenza Calcio players
Ancona-Matelica players
F.C. Legnago Salus players